Potholes State Park is a public recreation area on the southern shore of Potholes Reservoir, located  south of Moses Lake and  northwest of Othello in Grant County, Washington. The state park was created following the completion of the O'Sullivan Dam in 1949. The park's  include  of shoreline and facilities for camping, hiking, boating, swimming, fishing, and other water activities.

References

External links
Potholes State Park Washington State Parks and Recreation Commission 
Potholes State Park Map Washington State Parks and Recreation Commission

Parks in Grant County, Washington
State parks of Washington (state)